Dimitris Sounas (born on 12 August 1994) is a Greek professional footballer who plays as a midfielder for Italian  club Catanzaro.

Club career

Aris
Sounas started his career in youth teams of Aris. In 2012, new head coach Makis Katsavakis promoted him to the first team, and he made his debut on 14 August 2012, in a friendly game against Veria scoring a goal. From August 2012 he is also member of Greece's U19 national team after he was chosen from Kostas Tsanas, head of the U19 team. His professional debut was made on 27 August 2012 against Panionios and his first goal against Atromitos in Kleanthis Vikelidis in a 1–1 draw. On 23 September 2015, he dissolved his contract with the club.

Apollon Smyrnis
After 3 years in Aris, Sounas signed as a free agent, to play with Apollon Smyrnis in the Football League till the end of the 2016–17 season.

Monopoli
On 17 July 2016, Sounas has signed a contract with Lega Pro club Monopoli. He left the club having 93 appearances (4 goals, 17 assists) in all competitions.

Reggina
On 2 July 2019, Sounas has signed a contract with Lega Pro club Reggina until the summer of 2021 with an undisclosed fee.

Perugia
On 28 September 2020, he joined Serie C club Perugia. He lost his position in the squad after Perugia was promoted to Serie B for the 2021–22 season.

Catanzaro
On 13 January 2022, he signed a 2.5-year contract with Catanzaro, returning to Serie C.

Career statistics

References

External links
 Player info @ Guardian.touch-line.com

1994 births
Living people
Footballers from Moudania
Greek footballers
Association football midfielders
Super League Greece players
Football League (Greece) players
Aris Thessaloniki F.C. players
Apollon Smyrnis F.C. players
Serie B players
Serie C players
S.S. Monopoli 1966 players
Reggina 1914 players
A.C. Perugia Calcio players
U.S. Catanzaro 1929 players
Greek expatriate footballers
Greek expatriate sportspeople in Italy
Expatriate footballers in Italy
Greece youth international footballers
Greece under-21 international footballers